is a Japanese shōjo manga artist. She also uses the names Peco Fujiya (for yaoi works) and Ryou Fumizuki for doujinshi with her circle, Daisanteikoku.

Nakajo came in 39th in the 2007 Most Searched Mangaka Names by the Japanese search engine, goo.

About
She made her professional debut by winning the Outstanding Work award in the 18th Hakusensha Athena Newcomers' Awards for her work,  that was later published in the extra issue of Hana to Yume, Hana to Yume Planet Zōkan 15 July issue. She published her first one-shot as a professional manga artist titled,  in the 23rd issue of Hana to Yume in 1994.

Works

One-shots
Heart no Kajitsu
Futari no Hōsoku
17 Romance
Tasogare wa Sasayaku
Tokeru Koe
Natsu no Ran
Kawaki no Tsuki
Ō-sama Monogatari
Wild Kiss

Sent-in works
Manatsu no Hanzaisha

Short works
Yumemiru Happa
Usotsuki na Taiyō

Series
Missing Piece
Hana-Kimi
Sugar Princess

Contributions
Duel Love – Character design

References

External links
 Official website 

Living people
Manga artists from Osaka Prefecture
Women manga artists
1973 births
Japanese female comics artists
Female comics writers
Japanese women writers